Phobaeticus kirbyi is a very long stick insect native to Borneo. The holotype deposited at the Natural History Museum in London measures  excluding legs and  including legs. Both P. chani and Phobaeticus serratipes exceed it in total length with legs extended. However, recent specimens of P. kirbyi have only reached  in body length.

See also 

 List of largest insects

References

External links
 Phasmid Study Group: Phobaeticus kirbyi
 Phasmida Species File: Phobaeticus kirbyi

Phasmatidae
Endemic fauna of Borneo
Taxa named by Carl Brunner von Wattenwyl
Insects described in 1907
Phasmatodea of Malesia